This is a list of 193 species in the genus Nemoura, a genus of spring stoneflies in the family Nemouridae.

Nemoura species

 Nemoura abscissa Zwick, P., 1977 c g
 Nemoura aetolica Zwick, P., 1978 c g
 Nemoura akagii Kawai, 1960 c g
 Nemoura alaica Zhiltzova, 1976 c g
 Nemoura almaatensis Zhiltzova, 1979 c g
 Nemoura anas Murányi, 2007 c g
 Nemoura anguiculus Shimizu, 1997 c g
 Nemoura apicalis Sivec & Stark, 2010 c g
 Nemoura apollo Zwick, P., 1978 c g
 Nemoura aquila Murányi, 2011 c g
 Nemoura arctica Esben-Petersen, 1910 i c g
 Nemoura arlingtoni Wu, C.F., 1939 c g
 Nemoura asceta Murányi, 2007 c g
 Nemoura atristrigata Li, Weihai & D. Yang, 2007 c g
 Nemoura auberti Zwick, P., 1977 c g
 Nemoura avicularis Morton, 1894 c g
 Nemoura babai Kawai, 1966 c g
 Nemoura babiagorensis Sowa, 1964 c g
 Nemoura baiyunshana Li, Weihai, G. Wang & D. Yang, 2012 c g
 Nemoura basispina Li, Weihai & D. Yang, 2006 c g
 Nemoura bituberculata Kimmins, 1950 c g
 Nemoura bokhari Aubert, 1967 c g
 Nemoura braaschi Joost, 1970 c g
 Nemoura brachiptilus Motschulsky, 1853 c g
 Nemoura brevicauda Zwick, P., 1980 c g
 Nemoura brevilobata (Klapálek, 1912) c g
 Nemoura brevipennis Martynov, 1928 c g
 Nemoura bulgarica Raušer, 1962 c g
 Nemoura caligula Zwick, P., 1978 c g
 Nemoura cambrica Stephens, 1836 c g
 Nemoura carpathica Illies, 1963 c g
 Nemoura caspica Aubert, 1964 c g
 Nemoura ceciliae Aubert, 1956 c g
 Nemoura cercispinosa Kawai, 1960 c g
 Nemoura chattriki Aubert, 1967 c g
 Nemoura chinonis Okamoto, 1922 c g
 Nemoura chugi Aubert, 1967 c g
 Nemoura cinerea (Retzius, 1783) i c g
 Nemoura clavaloba Sivec & Stark, 2010 c g
 Nemoura cochleocercia Wu, C.F., 1962 c g
 Nemoura concava Li, Weihai & D. Yang, 2008 c g
 Nemoura confusa Zwick, P., 1970 c g
 Nemoura dentata Shimizu, 1997 c g
 Nemoura dentigera Shimizu, 1997 c g
 Nemoura despinosa Zhiltzova, 1977 c g
 Nemoura dromokeryx Theischinger, 1976 c g
 Nemoura dubitans Morton, 1894 c g
 Nemoura dulkeiti Zapekina-Dulkeit, 1975 c g
 Nemoura elegantula Martynov, 1928 c g
 Nemoura erratica Claassen, 1936 c g
 Nemoura espera Ham & Lee, 1999 c g
 Nemoura flaviscapa Aubert, 1956 c g
 Nemoura flexuosa Aubert, 1949 c g
 Nemoura floralis Li, Weihai & D. Yang, 2006 c g
 Nemoura formosana Shimizu, 1997 c g
 Nemoura fulva (Šámal, 1921) c g
 Nemoura fulviceps Klapalek, 1902 c g
 Nemoura furcocauda Wu, C.F., 1973 c g
 Nemoura fusca Kis, 1963 c g
 Nemoura fusiformis Chen & Y. Du, 2017 c g
 Nemoura geei Wu, C.F., 1929 c g
 Nemoura gemma Ham & Lee, 1998 c g
 Nemoura genei Rambur, 1842 c g
 Nemoura gladiata Uéno, 1929 c g
 Nemoura guangdongensis Li, Weihai & D. Yang, 2006 c g
 Nemoura hamata Kis, 1965 c g
 Nemoura hamulata Zhiltzova, 1971 c g
 Nemoura hangchowensis Chu, 1928 c g
 Nemoura hesperiae Consiglio, 1960 c g
 Nemoura hikosan Shimizu, 2016 c g
 Nemoura illiesi Mendl, H., 1968 c g
 Nemoura indica (Needham, 1909) c g
 Nemoura irani Aubert, 1964 c g
 Nemoura janeti Wu, C.F., 1938 c g
 Nemoura jejudoensis Zwick, P. & Baumann, 2011 c g
 Nemoura jezoensis Okamoto, 1922 c g
 Nemoura jilinensis Zhu, F. & D. Yang, 2003 c g
 Nemoura junhuae Li, Weihai & D. Yang, 2008 c g
 Nemoura khasanensis Teslenko, 2015 c g
 Nemoura khasii Aubert, 1967 c g
 Nemoura klapperichi Sivec, 1981 c g
 Nemoura kontumensis Fochetti & Ceci, 2017 c g
 Nemoura kopetdaghi Zhiltzova, 1976 c g
 Nemoura kownackorum Sowa, 1970 c g
 Nemoura kuhleni Aubert, 1967 c g
 Nemoura kuwayamai Kawai, 1966 c g
 Nemoura lacustris Pictet, A.E., 1865 c g
 Nemoura lahkipuri Aubert, 1967 c g
 Nemoura latilongispina Qian, Xiao, Chen & Du, 2018 g
 Nemoura lazoensis Zwick, P., 2010 c g
 Nemoura lepnevae Zhiltzova, 1971 c g
 Nemoura linguata Navás, 1918 c g
 Nemoura longicauda Kis, 1964 c g
 Nemoura longicercia Okamoto, 1922 c g
 Nemoura longilobata Shimizu, 1997 c g
 Nemoura lucana Nicolai & Fochetti, 1991 c g
 Nemoura lui Du, Y. & P. Zhou, 2008 c g
 Nemoura luteicornis Stephens, 1836 c g
 Nemoura magnicauda Zwick, P., 1980 c g
 Nemoura magniseta Sivec & Stark, 2010 c g
 Nemoura manchuriana Uéno, 1941 c g
 Nemoura marginata Pictet, 1836 i c g
 Nemoura martynovia Claassen, 1936 c g
 Nemoura masuensis (Li, Weihai & D. Yang, 2005) c g
 Nemoura matangshanensis Wu, C.F., 1935 c g
 Nemoura mawlangi Aubert, 1967 c g
 Nemoura meniscata Li, Weihai & D. Yang, 2007 c g
 Nemoura mesospina Li, Weihai & D. Yang, 2008 c g
 Nemoura miaofengshanensis Zhu, F. & D. Yang, 2003 c g
 Nemoura minima Aubert, 1946 c g
 Nemoura monae Joost, 1977 c g
 Nemoura monticola Raušer, 1965 c g
 Nemoura mortoni Ris, 1902 c g
 Nemoura moselyi Despax, 1934 c g
 Nemoura mucronata Li, Weihai & D. Yang, 2008 c g
 Nemoura nankinensis Wu, C.F., 1926 c g
 Nemoura naraiensis Kawai, 1954 c g
 Nemoura needhamia Wu, C.F., 1927 c g
 Nemoura neospiniloba Sivec & Stark, 2010 c g
 Nemoura nepalensis Zwick, P., 1980 c g
 Nemoura nervosa Pictet, F.J., 1836 c g
 Nemoura nigritarsis Pictet, F.J., 1836 c g
 Nemoura nigrodentata Zhiltzova, 1980 c g
 Nemoura normani Ricker, 1952 i c g
 Nemoura obtusa Ris, 1902 c g
 Nemoura oculata Wang, Z. & Y. Du, 2006 c g
 Nemoura oropensis Ravizza, C. & Ravizza Dematteis, 1980 c g
 Nemoura ovocercia Kawai, 1960 c g
 Nemoura ovoidalis Kis, 1965 c g
 Nemoura palliventris Aubert, 1953 c g
 Nemoura papilla Okamoto, 1922 c g
 Nemoura parafulva Zhiltzova, 1981 c g
 Nemoura perforata Li, Weihai & D. Yang, 2006 c g
 Nemoura peristeri Aubert, 1963 c g
 Nemoura persica Zwick, P., 1980 c g
 Nemoura pesarinii Ravizza, C. & Ravizza Dematteis, 1979 c g
 Nemoura petegariensis Kawai, 1971 c g
 Nemoura phasianusa Ham, 2009 c g
 Nemoura pirinensis Raušer, 1962 c g
 Nemoura pseudoerratica Vinçon & Pardo, 2003 c g
 Nemoura pygmaea Braasch & Joost, 1972 c g
 Nemoura quadrituberata Shimizu, 1997 c g
 Nemoura rahlae Jewett, 1958 c g
 Nemoura raptoraloba Sivec & Stark, 2010 c g
 Nemoura redimiculum Kawai, 1966 c g
 Nemoura remota Banks, 1920 c g
 Nemoura rickeri Jewett, 1971 i c g
 Nemoura rifensis Aubert, 1960 c g
 Nemoura rivorum Ravizza, C. & Ravizza Dematteis, 1995 c g
 Nemoura rotundprojecta Du, Y. & P. Zhou, 2008 c g
 Nemoura rugosa Zwick, P., 2010 c g
 Nemoura sabina Fochetti & Vinçon, 2009 c g
 Nemoura sachalinensis Matsumura, 1911 c g
 Nemoura saetifera Shimizu, 1997 c g
 Nemoura sahlbergi Morton, 1896 c g
 Nemoura sciurus Aubert, 1949 c g
 Nemoura securigera Klapálek, 1908 c g
 Nemoura serrarimi Aubert, 1967 c g
 Nemoura sichuanensis Li, Weihai & D. Yang, 2006 c g
 Nemoura sinuata Ris, 1902 c g
 Nemoura speustica Newman, 1851 c g
 Nemoura spinacerca Sivec & Stark, 2010 c g
 Nemoura spiniloba Jewett, 1954 i c g
 Nemoura spinosa Wu, C.F., 1939 c g
 Nemoura stellata Li, Weihai & D. Yang, 2008 c g
 Nemoura stratum Kawai, 1966 c g
 Nemoura stylocerca Sivec & Stark, 2010 c g
 Nemoura subtilis Klapálek, 1896 c g
 Nemoura taihangshana Wang, H., Weihai Li & D. Yang, 2013 c g
 Nemoura tamangi Sivec, 1980 c g
 Nemoura tau Zwick, P., 1973 c g
 Nemoura taurica Zhiltzova, 1967 c g
 Nemoura tenuiloba Sivec & Stark, 2010 c g
 Nemoura transsylvanica Kis, 1963 c g
 Nemoura transversospinosa Zhiltzova, 1979 c g
 Nemoura triangulifera Zwick, P., 1980 c g
 Nemoura tridenticula Li, Weihai, G. Wang & D. Yang, 2012 c g
 Nemoura tripotini Zwick, P., 2010 c g
 Nemoura trivittata Shimizu, 1997 c g
 Nemoura turcica Zwick, P., 1972 c g
 Nemoura uenoi Kawai, 1954 c g
 Nemoura uncinata Despax, 1934 c g
 Nemoura undulata Ris, 1902 c g
 Nemoura unicornis Jewett, 1975 c g
 Nemoura ussuriensis Zhiltzova, 1997 c g
 Nemoura viki Lillehammer, 1972 c g
 Nemoura vinconi Murányi, 2007 c g
 Nemoura wangi Li, Weihai & D. Yang, 2008 c g
 Nemoura wittmeri Zwick, P., 1975 c g
 Nemoura xistralensis Vinçon & Pardo, 2003 c g
 Nemoura yunnanensis Wu, C.F., 1939 c g
 Nemoura zaohensis Shimizu, 1997 c g
 Nemoura zwicki Sivec, 1980 c g

Data sources: i = ITIS, c = Catalogue of Life, g = GBIF, b = Bugguide.net

References

Nemoura
Articles created by Qbugbot